Mayankeshwar Sharan Singh is an Indian politician and a member of 17th Legislative Assembly of Tiloi of India. He represents the Tiloi constituency of Uttar Pradesh and is a member of the Bharatiya Janata Party.

Political career
A former member of the Samajwadi Party, Singh has been a member of the 14th and 17th Legislative Assemblies of Uttar Pradesh. He was expelled from the BJP in 2004. Since 2002, he has represented the Tiloi constituency and is a member of the BJP. On 26 October 2017, Singh indicated that he may leave the BJP.

Posts held

See also
Uttar Pradesh Legislative Assembly

References

Uttar Pradesh MLAs 2017–2022
Bharatiya Janata Party politicians from Uttar Pradesh
Living people
Year of birth missing (living people)
Samajwadi Party politicians from Uttar Pradesh
Uttar Pradesh MLAs 2022–2027